Longyear Lake is a lake in St. Louis County, in the U.S. state of Minnesota.

Longyear Lake bears the name of brothers who were businessmen in the local mining industry.

See also
List of lakes in Minnesota

References

Lakes of Minnesota
Lakes of St. Louis County, Minnesota